The Yardbirds are an English blues rock band from London. Formed in May 1963, the group originally included lead vocalist Keith Relf, lead guitarist Anthony "Top" Topham, rhythm guitarist Chris Dreja, bassist Paul Samwell-Smith and drummer Jim McCarty. In October, Topham was replaced by Eric Clapton. He remained until 13 March 1965, when he left due to creative disagreements. Clapton recommended Jimmy Page to replace him, but he declined and Jeff Beck took over. Page later joined on bass the following June, after Samwell-Smith abruptly quit; Dreja later took over the role, allowing Page to join Beck on guitar. This lineup was short-lived, however, as Beck left in November 1966. The group continued as a four-piece until July 1968, when Relf and McCarty left due to creative differences, primarily with Page. Dreja initially remained, but by August, Page formed a new group with vocalist Robert Plant, bassist John Paul Jones and drummer John Bonham, who later renamed themselves Led Zeppelin.

McCarty and Dreja reformed the Yardbirds in 1992, adding new members "Detroit" John Idan (lead vocals, lead guitar) and Rod Demick (bass, backing vocals) from the drummer's eponymous band, months later Demick left the band, Ray Majors joined on lead guitar, and Idan moved to bass. A recording of the Jim McCarty Band featuring Demick and Idan was released under the Yardbirds name as Reunion Jam. In 1996, Majors was replaced by Gypie Mayo, and later Garman was replaced by Alan Glen. This lineup remained stable for seven years, releasing the band's first new studio album since 1967, Birdland, in 2003. Shortly after the album's touring cycle, Glen left the Yardbirds and was replaced by Billy Boy Miskimmin. Mayo also left the band at the end of 2004, with Jerry Donahue taking his place. Donahue remained for a year, before he was replaced by Ben King.

In 2008, Glen returned to replace Miskimmin, although only remained for a year before leaving again. Also in 2009, Idan left the Yardbirds after 14 years as the band's frontman. To replace Glen and Idan, the group added Andy Mitchell on lead vocals, acoustic guitar and harmonica, with David Smale joining on bass. The band's lineup remained stable until early 2012, when Dreja was forced to stop performing after suffering two strokes. The following July, it was announced that Dreja would be leaving the band, with original member Top Topham taking his place. On 30 January 2015, this lineup played its final show at the 100 Club in London. A few days later, it was announced that McCarty and Topham would return with former lead singer and guitarist Idan, bassist Kenny Aaronson and Myke Scavone on harmonica and percussion.

Within a month of announcing a new lineup in February 2015, the Yardbirds postponed all tour dates due to "health concerns and extenuating circumstances". In May, guitarist Earl Slick was added to the band's lineup in place of Topham, and the shows were rescheduled for later in the year. However, due to "scheduling conflicts" Slick was unable to tour with the group, and on 12 August 2015 Johnny A. was announced as the band's new lead guitarist. Johnny A. remained until July 2018, when he was replaced by Godfrey Townsend.

Current members

Former members

Timeline

Original run (1963–1968)

Reunion (1992–present)

Lineups

References

External links
The Yardbirds official website

Yardbirds, The